People's Alliance Party  may refer to:

 People's Alliance Party (Albania)
 People's Alliance Party (Solomon Islands)

See also
 People's Alliance (disambiguation)
 People's Alliance of New Brunswick
 People's Alliance for Democracy